FK Ohrid Lote was a football club from the city of Ohrid, North Macedonia.

History
The club was founded in 2009. They was played at the SRC Biljanini Izvori, which has a capacity of 3,000 seats. The nickname of Ohrid Lote was "developers".

In the club's first season as Ohrid Lote, it was champion of the Macedonian Third League – South West Region, directly qualifying for promotion to the Macedonian Second League. Ohrid Lote won the 2010 Ohrid municipal soccer cup, defeating defending champion Ohrid 2004 2–0 with two goals from Nikolce Stojkovski.

Ohrid Lote participated in the 2010–11 Macedonian Cup, losing 3–1 away to Bregalnica Štip in the first round.

References

External links
Club former website 
FK Ohrid Lote on Soccerway
Club info at Macedonian Football 

Defunct football clubs in North Macedonia
Association football clubs established in 2009
Association football clubs disestablished in 2012
2009 establishments in the Republic of Macedonia
2012 disestablishments in the Republic of Macedonia
FK